Arnold Clas ("Classe") Robert Thunberg (5 April 1893 – 28 April 1973) was a Finnish speed skater who won five Olympic gold medals – three at the inaugural Winter Olympics held in Chamonix in 1924 (along with a silver and a bronze medal) and two at the 1928 Winter Olympics held in St. Moritz. He was the most successful athlete at both of these Winter Olympics, sharing the honour for 1928 Winter Olympics with Johan Grøttumsbraaten of Norway. 
No other athlete ever won such a high fraction of all Olympic events at a single Games. 
He was born and died in Helsinki.

Short biography
Thunberg began with speed skating rather late, at the age of 18, having led a somewhat rowdy life as a compulsive smoker and drinker before he concentrated fully on his sport. However, from the age of 28 – when he turned up at his first European Allround Championships – and for the following ten years, he was by far the most-winning skater.

Thunberg's greatest strengths were the shortest distances, the 500 through 5000 metres. He never won an international 10000 metre event, although he did win a silver medal on the 10000 metres at the 1924 Winter Olympics – beaten by three seconds by compatriot Julius Skutnabb. Thunberg won three gold medals at the 1924 Olympics – the allround event, the 1500 metres and the 5000 metres. He remains the only person to have won an Olympic gold medal in allround speed skating, as despite the status of allround as the premier skating event, at least up until the 1990s, the event was abolished in the Olympics from 1928 onwards.

Thunberg won five World Allround Championships titles from 1923 to 1931, and also four European Allround Championships titles. He also took two more gold medals at the 1928 Winter Olympics, to end with five, and these two medals made him the oldest Olympic Speed Skating Champion, at the age of 34. However, despite his amazing run, he was occasionally vulnerable on the long distances. If his 500 and 1,500 metre events did not go exactly according to plan, then he could be beaten – as shown in the 1927 season when the 22-year-old Bernt Evensen pipped him to both the World and European title. Evensen, however, could never string together the long run of victories that Thunberg ended up with.

Despite his amazing career record, Thunberg never reached the top of Adelskalender – a statistical invention which ranks skaters according to their personal bests and then converts them into allround performances, using a table. Oscar Mathisen's personal bests on the three longest distances were simply too good for Thunberg to match. However, Mathisen – who was born five years before Thunberg – turned professional during World War I, meaning that the two never met in an ISU-sanctioned event.

Record

World records
Over the course of his career, Thunberg skated four world records:

Source: SpeedSkatingStats.com

Personal records

Note that Thunberg's personal record on the 3000 m was not recognised as an official world record.

Thunberg has an Adelskalender score of 192.633 points. His highest ranking on the Adelskalender was a second place.

Medals
An overview of medals won by Thunberg at important championships he participated in, listing the years in which he won each:

Source: SpeedSkatingStats.com

See also
List of multiple Olympic gold medalists

References

1893 births
1973 deaths
Burials at Hietaniemi Cemetery
Finnish male speed skaters
Swedish-speaking Finns
Speed skaters at the 1924 Winter Olympics
Speed skaters at the 1928 Winter Olympics
Olympic speed skaters of Finland
Medalists at the 1924 Winter Olympics
Medalists at the 1928 Winter Olympics
Olympic medalists in speed skating
Olympic gold medalists for Finland
Olympic silver medalists for Finland
Olympic bronze medalists for Finland
World record setters in speed skating
Sportspeople from Helsinki
World Allround Speed Skating Championships medalists